Igor Subbotin (born 26 June 1990) is an Estonian international footballer who plays as a midfielder for Estonian Meistriliiga club Nõmme Kalju.

Club career

Levadia
Subbotin made his debut for Levadia in 2009. He won his first Meistriliiga title with Levadia in the 2009 season and two more in the 2013 and the 2014 seasons.

International career
Subbotin made his international debut for Estonia on 31 May 2014 against Finland.

Honours

Club
Levadia
Meistriliiga: 2009, 2013, 2014
Estonian Cup: 2009–10, 2011–12, 2013–14
Estonian Supercup: 2010, 2013

Individual
Meistriliiga Fans Player of the Year: 2014

References

External links

1990 births
Living people
Estonian footballers
Estonia international footballers
Estonian people of Russian descent
FCI Levadia Tallinn players
Esiliiga players
Meistriliiga players
FK Mladá Boleslav players
Nõmme Kalju FC players
Expatriate footballers in Poland
Estonian expatriate sportspeople in Poland
Expatriate footballers in the Czech Republic
Estonian expatriate sportspeople in the Czech Republic
FCI Levadia U21 players
Estonian expatriate footballers
Association football wingers